Rybicki (feminine: Rybicka; plural: Rybiccy) is a Polish surname. Notable people with the surname include:

 Anna Rybicka (born 1977), Polish fencer
 Arkadiusz Rybicki (1953–2010), Polish politician
 Franz Rybicki (1924–2014), Austrian football manager
 James Rybicki, American intelligence official
 Jerzy Rybicki (born 1953), Polish boxer
 Mariusz Rybicki (born 1993), Polish footballer
 Sławomir Rybicki (born 1960), Polish politician
 Wojciech Rybicki (born 1942), Polish composer

See also
 
 

Polish-language surnames